Tinnyse Jamel Johnson is a beauty queen who represented The Bahamas in Miss World 2008 in South Africa. She studied business administration, intending to own a conglomerate of businesses geared towards motivational products and services.

1986 births
Living people
Miss World 2008 delegates
Bahamian beauty pageant winners
People from Nassau, Bahamas
Date of birth missing (living people)